The Little North Santiam River is a  tributary of the North Santiam River in western Oregon in the United States.

The river begins in the Opal Creek Wilderness at the confluence of Battle Ax and Opal creeks in Willamette National Forest and flows generally west-southwest through forests within Marion County to meet the larger river near Mehama. North Fork Road runs along the stream's lower reaches until it meets Forest Road 2209, which continues upstream to Opal Creek Trailhead.

Named tributaries from source to mouth are Opal, Battle Ax, Gold, Horn, Tincup, Cold, Stack, Cedar, and Little Cedar creeks. Then come Dry, Henline, Evans, Fawn, Elkhorn, Fish, Sinker, Moorehouse, and Big creeks. Further downstream are Cougar, Bear, Canyon, Kiel, Beaver, Jeeter, Cox, and Polly creeks.

Recreation

Camping and day-use
Shady Cove Campground, managed by the United States Forest Service, is in the Opal Creek Scenic Recreation Area of Willamette National Forest along the upper river. Shady Cove's amenities include limited parking, sites for tent and trailer camping, picnic tables, toilets, and access to hiking trails but no drinking water. The campground is open all year but may be blocked by snow in winter and can be quite wet in April and May.

Downriver from Shady Cove is the Three Pools Day Use Area, also managed by the Forest Service. About 15,000 people visit the site annually. The area features "three spectacular emerald pools", used for swimming in the river. Amenities include picnic sites and restrooms but no drinking water.

It is a day-use site that features a  waterfall. Amenities include picnic tables, a restroom, and access to the river and to hiking trails. The park is open from May 1 to October 31.

On down the river from Salmon Falls, the Bureau of Land Management (BLM) oversees the Little North Santiam Recreation Area and its Elkhorn Valley Recreation Site, which has 23 tent and trailer campsites, 4 picnic sites, parking, toilets, drinking water, and access to trails and river beaches. Canyon Creek Recreation Site, a separate day-use park managed by the BLM, has 15 picnic sites, a sandy river beach, drinking water, parking, and toilets. Both sites are generally open from Memorial Day through Labor Day.

Open from May 1 through October 31, it has 15 campsites with amenities including parking, a campground host, picnic tables, fire pits, a restroom, and access to the river and a hiking trail.

Further downstream is North Fork Park, a  day-use area managed by Marion County. Open from May 1 through October 31, it has picnic tables, river access, hiking trails, and a restroom.

Fishing
The river supports populations of rainbow trout (including runs of steelhead), as well as cutthroat trout. Trout fishing, best along the stream's upper reaches, is catch and release. Chinook salmon also frequent the river, but fishing for them on the Little North Santiam is not allowed.

See also
List of rivers of Oregon

References

External links
 North Santiam Watershed Council

Rivers of Oregon
Rivers of Marion County, Oregon